Fraidy Cat is a 1975 comical children's cartoon show that originally appeared as a segment on Filmation's  short-lived ABC series Uncle Croc's Block. 18 episodes were planned for inclusion on Uncle Croc's Block; 12 were ultimately made. The remaining six were scrapped due to the show getting removed from Uncle Croc’s Block when the latter was shortened to a half hour. Episodes would be aired in short 6-7 minute story formats.

The premise revolves around a nervous cat who is haunted by his eight past forefathers from different time periods. He tries to avoid saying any single digit number (excluding zero), as doing so will cause a spirit from a time period to appear and haunt him. 

The show was aired in the USA on ABC, Canal+ in France, Junior in Germany, and Super Écran in certain French areas of Canada.

Background
The show stars Fraidy "Nine" Cat (voiced by Alan Oppenheimer), an unlucky and miserable cat who, like all cats, has nine lives, but has used up eight of them and is on his ninth and last life, where he wants to make it last the longest. 

The running gag of the series is that as if Fraidy's life was not miserable enough, nearly every time Fraidy inadvertently says out loud any single-digit number (from  one to eight), or any word or any part of a word that rhymes with or sounds the same as the number's name in any language, sometimes, a ghost from one of his former life ancestors will appear and mistakenly tend to make things even worse for the hopeless cat.

In each episode, Fraidy gets himself into a predicament caused by himself, or something else, such as a dog, or another aggressor. This can include ending up into a sketchy town, a junkyard, or a bird shop, and usually has the character inhabiting said area to rebel in some sort of action against Fraidy. Fraidy always ends up saying a number “one” through “eight” out of pure accident, and each ghost cat corresponding to that number tries to help Fraidy in the situation. Saying “nine” however, summons a short-tempered storm cloud in the shape of the number nine.

The spirits include:

 Elafunt "Cave One" Cat (voiced by Lennie Weinrib) - A prehistoric saber-toothed tiger with a caveman motif. He owns a huge pet brontosaurus named "Ant" (voiced by Lennie Weinrib). Ant is usually a hiding spot for Fraidy if someone is on the lookout for him.
 Kitty "Two" Wizard (voiced by Lennie Weinrib) - A befuddled wizard whose wand is often on the wrong setting. He is the most problematic of the ghosts, with his goofing up causing Fraidy more hindering than help.
 Captain "Three" Kitt (voiced by Lennie Weinrib) - A pirate who is the self-proclaimed "buccaneer's buccaneer". He has a tendency to steal things such as keys and money, due to his pirate heritage.
 Sir Walter "Four" Cat (voiced by Lennie Weinrib) - A foppish Elizabethan nobleman who is also an expert swordsman. He tends to look out for Fraidy the most and is the most loyal of the spirits.
 William "Billy Five" the Kit (voiced by Lennie Weinrib) - A western cowboy. He is a small guy with a very loud voice, with a problematic lasso that is summoned along with him.
 Jasper "Six" Catdaver (voiced by Lou Scheimer) - An undertaker who actually prefers to expedite Fraidy's passing to the "Other Side", though not out of spite. He is ironically the least troublesome of the ghosts. 
 Captain Eddie "Seven" Kittenbacker (voiced by Lennie Weinrib) - A pilot who is a very erratic flier, usually resulting in his plane flying upside-down or sideways. His name is a play on Eddie Rickenbacker, a WWI fighter ace.
 Hep "Eight" Cat (voiced by Lennie Weinrib) - A zoot-suited jive-talking street cat with a beatnik accent. He tends to be the most helpful in cases, although usually backfiring. 
 Cloud Nine (voiced by Alan Oppenheimer) - As accidentally saying a number from one to eight gets Fraidy a ghost, as if to fill the void towards his last life, saying "nine" calls forth an ominous, malevolent storm cloud (shaped like the number nine) which immediately gives chase after Fraidy, attempting to blast him with bolts of lightning until Fraidy manages to either outrun the cloud or its (supposedly) limited time it can stay expires.

Episodes
The twelve existing episodes listed were made before the cancellation of Uncle Croc's Block. The episodes listed after "A Semi Star is Born" were in production and eventually scrapped after Uncle Croc's Block was shortened to a half-hour.

Production
One of the few original series (outside of an adaptation) to be produced by Filmation; Fraidy Cat was later syndicated as part of the Groovie Goolies and Friends series.

After the 12th episode, the series was supposed to have 6 more episodes, but due to a business decision erected by ABC, Uncle Croc's Block was shortened to a half-hour time slot and ultimately cancelled. Fraidy Cat was cut from the shortened episodes. The 6 aforementioned episodes never made it past the writing and storyboard stage, as Filmation chose to pocket the money (which ABC had already paid) rather than finish production. There is still debate as to whether the show has 12 or 18 episodes.

In 1995, Hallmark acquired Filmation, and a mass conversion of NTSC to PAL of the master tapes sped the tapes up by 0.5%. Most of the original NTSC versions of Fraidy Cat are on many public domain DVDs. All surviving NTSC episodes were ripped from VHS tapes, with 3 episodes being exceptions. The original NTSC master tapes of the show are considered lost media.

Home Media and Copyright Status
In 1985, Fraidy Cat  saw a video release by The Video Collection.

{| class="wikitable"
!width="225"| Title
!width="110"| Release Date
!Additional Information
|-
|The Video Collection: Fraidy Cat||November 3, 1986||Episodes: Feline Fortune, Puss 'n' Boats, A Scaredy Fraidy, Meaner Than a Junkyard Cat, Cupid and the Cat, Over The Wall and Havin' a Ball, Choo Choo Fraidy, Magic Numbers, A Semi-Star is Born
</table>

All of the produced Fraidy Cat episodes were released by UK-based Boulevard Entertainment on two DVD volumes in the 2000s and later by BCI on a compilation DVD called Frightfully Funny Volume Two, which also included episodes of Groovie Goolies and Filmation's Ghostbusters. These DVD releases brought Fraidy Cat back into the public eye after decades of scarce home media releases.

{| class="wikitable"
!width="225"| Title
!width="110"| Release Date
!Additional Information
|-
|The Frightfully Funny Collection: Volume 2||October 21, 2008||Episodes: The Not-So-Nice Mice, Cupid and the Cat, Over The Wall and Havin' a Ball, Feline Fortune, Puss 'n' Boats, A Scaredy Fraidy, Meaner Than a Junkyard Cat, Love is a Many Feathered Thing, It's a Dog’s Life, Choo Choo Fraidy, Magic Numbers, A Semi-Star is Born
</table>

Because of Filmation’s decision of not including their copyright info on the individual segments (the copyright notice was included on the Uncle Croc's Block series as a whole), Fraidy Cat has mistakenly believed to have fallen into the public domain and 75% of the show’s output has shown up on many public domain compilation DVDs. These episodes are heavily bootlegged, and are instead taken from grainy VHS releases of the show instead of their masters.

Contrary to popular belief, the show resides under the copyright of DreamWorks/NBCUniversal who currently owns the Filmation catalogue as of 2022.

Fraidy Cat has yet to resurface on  streaming services and home video officially.

References

External links
 
 
 Fraidy Cat at Don Markstein's Toonopedia. Archived from the original on July 30, 2016.

1970s American animated television series
1975 American television series debuts
1975 American television series endings
American children's animated comedy television series
Animated television series about cats
Television series by Filmation
Television series by Universal Television